The following is a list of notable deaths in July 2013.

Entries for each day are listed alphabetically by surname. A typical entry lists information in the following sequence:
 Name, age, country of citizenship and reason for notability, established cause of death, reference.

July 2013

1
 Armand Baeyens, 85, Belgian racing cyclist.
Jack Boles, 88, British Colonial Service officer.
 Sidney Bryan Berry, 87, American military officer, United States Military Academy at West Point chief, heart failure.
 Texas Johnny Brown, 85, American blues musician and songwriter.
 Victor Engström, 24, Swedish bandy player, liver cancer.
 Charles Foley, 82, American toy and board game inventor, co-creator of Twister, complications from Alzheimer's disease.
Maurice Foley, 83, Australian cricketer and Olympic field hockey player.
 Stoyan Ganev, 57, Bulgarian diplomat and politician, Foreign Minister (1991–1992), President of the United Nations General Assembly (1992–1993), cancer.
 Rolf Graf, 53, Norwegian musician (Lava).
 William H. Gray III, 71, American politician, member of the U.S. House of Representatives from Pennsylvania (1979–1991), House Majority Whip (1989–1991), natural causes.
 David Halvorson, 64, American politician, member of the Montana House of Representatives (since 2013), cancer.
 Paul Jenkins, 74, American actor (The Waltons, Chinatown, Dynasty).
 Ulrich Matschoss, 96, German actor.
Mita Noor, 42, Bangladeshi actress, suicide by hanging.
 Rolf Nordhagen, 85, Norwegian physicist and computer scientist.
Barbara Robotham, 77, English mezzo-soprano and voice teacher.
 Bent Schmidt-Hansen, 66, Danish footballer (PSV Eindhoven).
 Gary Shearston, 74, Australian singer and songwriter, stroke.
 Maarten van Roozendaal, 51, Dutch singer-songwriter, lung cancer.
René Sparenberg, 94, Dutch field hockey player.
 Maureen Waaka, 70, New Zealand politician and pageant contestant, Miss World New Zealand (1962), complications from a stroke.
 Ján Zlocha, 71, Slovak footballer.

2
 Anthony G. Bosco, 85, American Roman Catholic prelate, Bishop of Greensburg (1987–2004).
 Gregory Carroll, 35, American operatic tenor, heart attack.
Hilda Clayton, 22, American combat photographer, mortar shell explosion.
Emilio Croci-Torti, 93, Swiss cyclist.
 Douglas Engelbart, 88, American scientist, inventor of the computer mouse, kidney failure.
 Fawzia Fuad of Egypt, 91, Egyptian royal, Queen consort of Iran (1941–1948).
 Nilo Floody, 91, Chilean Olympic modern pentathlete (1948, 1952, 1956).
 Armand Gaudreault, 91, Canadian ice hockey player (Boston Bruins).
 Bengt Hallberg, 80, Swedish jazz pianist.
 Sef Imkamp, 88, Dutch politician.
 Noboru Kousaka, 94, Japanese politician.
 Hugh Lee, 58, Taiwanese Golden Bell-award-winning television actor and theatre director, bowel cancer.
 Anthony Llewellyn, 80, Welsh-born American chemist and astronaut candidate (NASA).
 Paul Lorieau, 71, Canadian national anthem singer (Edmonton Oilers) and optometrist, cancer.
 Lothar Pongratz, 61, German Olympic bobsledder.
 Theodore Reed, 90, American zookeeper and administrator, director of the  National Zoo (1958–1983), complications from Alzheimer's disease.
 Arlan Stangeland, 83, American politician, member of the U.S. House of Representatives from Minnesota (1977–1991) and the Minnesota House of Representatives (1966–1975).

3
 Claude Arabo, 75, French Olympic fencer (1964).
 Thengamam Balakrishnan, 86, Indian politician, journalist and editor (Janayugom), Kerala MLA for Adoor (1970–1975).
 Roman Bengez, 49, Slovenian football player and manager.
Ray Coates, 89, American football player (New York Giants).
 Vincenzo Cozzi, 86, Italian Roman Catholic prelate, Bishop of Melfi-Rapolla-Venosa (1981–2002).
Johnny MacRae, 84, American country music composer.
 Azelio Manzetti, 84, Italian prelate, Chief Chaplain of the Sovereign Military Order of Malta.
 Frank Morriss, 85, American film editor (Romancing the Stone, Short Circuit, Blue Thunder).
 John Nunn, 94, British Royal Air Force officer and politician.
Kenneth Olayombo, 65, Nigerian footballer.
 Maria Pasquinelli, 100, Italian Fascist and murderer.
 Amar Roy Pradhan, 82, Indian politician, MP for Cooch Behar (1977–1999), West Bengal MLA for Mekhliganj (1962–1977).
 Francis Ray, 68, American writer.
 PJ Torokvei, 62, Canadian actor, producer and screenwriter (WKRP in Cincinnati, Real Genius), complications from liver failure.
 Radu Vasile, 70, Romanian politician, historian and poet, Prime Minister (1998–1999) and MP (1992–2004), colon cancer.
 Bernard Vitet, 77, French jazz musician and composer.
 Snoo Wilson, 64, English playwright and screenwriter, heart attack.

4
 Javier Artiñano, 70, Spanish film costume designer.
John Barrington-Ward, 84, British Olympic sailor.
Mynampati Bhaskar, 67, Indian writer and journalist.
Bernardine Bishop, 73, English novelist and teacher, colon cancer.
 Onllwyn Brace, 80, Welsh rugby union player.
 Jim Buck, 81, American dog walker, complications of emphysema and cancer.
 Jack Crompton, 91, English footballer (Manchester United).
 Mahasundari Devi, 82, Indian Madhubani painter and artist, recipient of the Padma Shri award (2011).
 James Fulton, 73, American dermatologist and medical researcher, co-discoverer of Retin-A, colon cancer.
 Willie Hargreaves, 82, English rugby league player (York).
 Charles A. Hines, 77, American military officer, commander of Fort McClellan (1989–1994), heart attack.
Hung Chung-chiu, 23, Taiwanese soldier, organ failure.
 Tony Licari, 92, Canadian ice hockey player (Detroit Red Wings).
 Innocent Lotocky, 97, Ukrainian-born American Ukrainian Greek Catholic hierarch, Bishop of the Western United States (1981–1993).
 Iain McColl, 59, Scottish actor (Gangs of New York), cancer.
 Madan Mohan Mishra, 81, Nepalese author.
 Bernie Nolan, 52, Irish singer (The Nolans) and actress, breast cancer.
 Oliver Red Cloud, 93, American Oglala Sioux chief.
 Leslie Lloyd Rees, 94, British prelate, Anglican Bishop of Shrewsbury (1980–1986).
 Pamela Ropner, 82, British author.
 Ahmed Rushdi, 89, Egyptian interior minister (1984–1986).
Robert L. Rutherford, 74, American general, natural causes.
 Richard Waters, 77, American artist, inventor of the waterphone.

5
Akitsugu Amata, 85, Japanese swordsmith.
 Bud Asher, 88, American politician and football coach, Mayor of Daytona Beach, Florida (1995–2003).
 Duane Berentson, 84, American politician, member of the Washington House of Representatives (1962–1980), director of the WSDOT (1981–1993).
 David Cargo, 84, American politician, Governor of New Mexico (1967–1971), member of the New Mexico House of Representatives (1963–1967), complications from a stroke.
 Paul Couvret, 91, Dutch-born Australian politician and military veteran.
 Billy Cross, 84, American football player (Chicago Cardinals, Toronto Argonauts).
 John Curran, 59, American financial journalist and editor (Fortune, Bloomberg News), amyotrophic lateral sclerosis.
 Douglas Dayton, 88, American retail executive, founder of Target Corporation, cancer.
 Alice Masak French, 83, Canadian Inuvialuit author, poet and artist.
 Jean Guy, 90, American First Lady of North Dakota (1961–1973), complications from a stroke.
 Curtis Harnack, 86, American non-fiction author, President of Yaddo (1971–1987).
 Hue Hollins, 72, American NBA referee.
 Robert Lipka, 68, Soviet Union spy in USA.
 Clinton Pattea, 82, American politician, President of the Fort McDowell Yavapai Nation.
 Gwyn Hanssen Pigott, 77, Australian ceramicist, stroke.
 Ama Quiambao, 65, Filipino actress, heart attack.
 Daniel Wegner, 65, Canadian-born American social psychologist.
 Lambert Jackson Woodburne, 73, South African vice admiral.
 Sheila Wright, 88, British politician, MP for Birmingham Handsworth (1979–1983).

6
 Erik Ahldén, 89, Swedish Olympic long-distance runner (1948).
 John Chun, 84, North Korean-born American car designer (Shelby Mustang, Tonka Toys), stomach cancer.
 John Hightower, 80, American museum director (Museum of Modern Art 1969–1970, Maritime Aquarium at Norwalk, Mariners' Museum 1993–2007).
 David Johnson, 67, British racehorse owner (Comply or Die), cancer.
 Rudy Keeling, 64, American college basketball coach (University of Maine, Northeastern University), Commissioner of the Eastern College Athletic Conference (2007–2013).
 Santo Krishnan, 93, Indian actor and stunt man.
 Robert Linderholm, 79, American astronomer.
*Lo Hsing Han, 77, Burmese drug trafficker and business tycoon (Asia World), heart failure.
Thomas F. Malone, 96, American geophysicist.
 Leland Mitchell, 72, American basketball player (New Orleans Buccaneers).
 Tony Naughton, 61, Australian academic.
 Hamilton Nichols, 88, American NFL football player.
 Ruben J. Villote, 80, Filipino Roman Catholic priest and activist.
 Josip Torbar, 91, Croatian politician.
 Senji Yamaguchi, 82, Japanese atomic bomb survivor (Nagasaki) and anti-war activist.

7
 James Bean, 80, American politician, member of the Mississippi Senate (1988–2000), complications from a stroke.
 William Grant Black, 93, American prelate, Bishop of the Episcopal Diocese of Southern Ohio.
 John Bockris, 90, South African–born American scientist.
 Sudhakar Bokade, 57, Indian film producer (Izzatdaar, Saajan), complications from heart attack.
 Berna Carrasco, 98, Chilean chess master.
 Tom Christian, 77, Pitcairn Island radio operator, complications from a stroke.
 Joe Conley, 85, American actor (The Waltons, Cast Away, Mister Ed), complications from dementia.
 MC Daleste, 20, Brazilian rapper, shot.
 Artur Hajzer, 51, Polish climber, fall.
 Robert Hamerton-Kelly, 74, South African-born American Christian theologian and academic.
 Rosalind Hudson, 86, British codebreaker and architectural model maker.
 Donald J. Irwin, 86, American politician, member of the U.S. House of Representatives from Connecticut (1959–1961, 1965–1969), heart failure.
Barbara Erickson London, 93, American pilot.
François Xavier Nguyên Quang Sách, 88, Vietnamese Roman Catholic prelate, Bishop of Đà Nẵng (1988–2000).
 Ben Pucci, 88, American football player.
 Charles Quinn, 82, American journalist (NBC News), heart failure.
Alfred Rozelaar Green, 96, British artist.
Charles Sowa, 80, Luxembourgian race walker and coach.
Joan Stambaugh, 81, American philosopher.
 Anna Wing, 98, British actress (EastEnders, Son of Rambow).

8
 Norman Atkinson, 90, British politician, MP for Tottenham (1964–1987).
Robert Bossenger, 72, South African cricketer.
 Chase, 13, American golden retriever, bat dog and mascot for the Trenton Thunder, cancer.
 Albert Dehert, 91, Belgian footballer (K. Berchem Sport).
 Berhanu Dinka, 78, Ethiopian diplomat and economist, Ambassador to Djibouti, Canada, the U.S. and the United Nations, cancer.
 Paul Feiler, 95, German-born British painter (St. Ives School).
 Dick Gray, 81, American baseball player (Los Angeles Dodgers, St. Louis Cardinals).
 Bob Hardesty, 82, American speechwriter (Lyndon B. Johnson), heart failure.
 Dave Hickson, 83, British footballer.
 James Loper, 81, American television executive (KCET), director of the Academy of Television Arts and Sciences (1984–1999).
Eunice Macaulay, 90, British-born Academy Award–winning animator.
 Edmund Morgan, 97, American historian and author.
 Joaquín Piña Batllevell, 83, Spanish-born Argentinian Roman Catholic prelate, Bishop of Puerto Iguazú (1986–2006).
 Tunggan Mangudadatu Piang, Filipino politician, ARMM MLA for Maguindanao, heart attack.
 Nadezhda Popova, 91, Russian military pilot, awarded Hero of the Soviet Union.
 Claudiney Ramos, 33, Brazilian-born Equatorial Guinean footballer, malaria.
 Rubby Sherr, 99, American physicist and academic, member of the Manhattan Project, co-inventor of Fuchs-Sherr modulated neutron initiator.
Sir Ian Sinclair, 87, British lawyer.
 Sabawi Ibrahim al-Tikriti, 66, Iraqi intelligence officer, half brother of Saddam Hussein, cancer.
 Sundri Uttamchandani, 88, Indian writer.
 Brett Walker, 51, American songwriter, musician and record producer.
 Frank Woodrow Wilson, 89, American politician, member of Louisiana House of Representatives.

9
 Anton Antonov-Ovseyenko, 93, Russian historian and writer.
 Guido Breña López, 82, Peruvian Roman Catholic prelate, Bishop of Ica (1973–2007).
 Markus Büchel, 54, Liechtenstein politician, Prime Minister (1993).
 Arturo Cruz, 89, Nicaraguan economist and politician.
 Andrzej Czyżniewski, 59, Polish footballer, heart attack.
Fasliyev, 16, American Thoroughbred racehorse and active sire.
 Jim Foglesong, 90, American country music executive (Capitol Records) and producer (Garth Brooks), Country Music Hall of Fame inductee (2004).
Mary Ellen Hopkins, 79-80, American quilter and author, stroke.
 Kiril of Varna, 59, Bulgarian Orthodox hierarch, Metropolitan of Varna and Veliki Preslav (since 1989), drowning.
 Rasu Madhuravan, 44, Indian Tamil film director, cancer.
 Željko Malnar, 69, Croatian writer and documentarist.
J. Paul McGrath, 72, American attorney.
 Kirsty Milne, 49, Scottish journalist and academic, lung cancer.
 Andrew Nori, 60-61, Solomon Islands politician and coup leader, Minister for Home Affairs (1984–1988), Minister for Finance (1993–1994).
 Johannes Østtveit, 86, Norwegian politician.
 Marsi Paribatra, 81, Thai royal and artist.
 Robert Pechous, 79, American politician, member of the Illinois House of Representatives (1977–1983).
 Bhagwati Prasad, Indian politician, Uttar Pradesh MLA for Ikauna (1967–1969, 1969–1974), multiple organ failure.
 Barbara Robinson, 85, American children's author (The Best Christmas Pageant Ever), cancer.
 Toshi Seeger, 91, American environmental activist and filmmaker, founder of the Clearwater Festival.
 Gaétan Soucy, 54, Canadian novelist, heart attack.
 Andrea Veneracion, 84, Filipino singer, National Artist (1999), founder of the University of the Philippines Madrigal Singers.
 George Weissbort, 85, Belgian-born British artist.
 Masao Yoshida, 58, Japanese nuclear engineer, chief manager of the Fukushima Daiichi plant during the 2011 nuclear disaster, esophageal cancer.

10
 Audrey Amiss, 79, British Artist (1933-2013).
 Colin Bennetts, 72, British Anglican prelate, Bishop of Coventry (1998–2008), brain tumour.
 Philip Caldwell, 93, American corporate executive, Chairman and CEO of the Ford Motor Company (1979–1985), complications from a stroke.
Willem Adriaan Cruywagen, 91-92,  South African politician.
 Józef Gara, 84, Polish linguist and Wymysorys language activist.
*Concha García Campoy, 54, Spanish radio and television journalist, leukemia.
 Caroline Duby Glassman, 90, American judge, first woman appointed to the Maine Supreme Judicial Court (1983–1997).
Kemal Güven, 91-92, Turkish politician, Speaker of the Grand National Assembly (1973–1977).
 Ilan Halevi, 69, French-born Palestinian diplomat and adviser.
 Ana Emilia Lahitte, 91, Argentine writer. 
 Gokulananda Mahapatra, 92, Indian science fiction and children's author.
Dicky Mayes, 90, English cricketer.
 Walter McCaffrey, 64, American activist and politician (New York City Council, 1985–2001), complications from a traffic collision.
Awadh Kishore Narain, 88, Indian historian.
 Ku Ok-hee, 56, South Korean golfer, President of the Korean LPGA (2011–2012), heart attack.
Paschal O'Hare, 81, Irish solicitor and politician.
 K.V.Ramesh, 78, Indian epigraphist.
 Mabel Sonnier Savoie, 73, American singer and guitar player.
 William Ralph Turner, 93, British painter.
 Ibrahim Youssef, 54, Egyptian Olympic (1984) footballer (Zamalek SC), heart attack.

11
 Zeb Alley, 84, American politician, member of the North Carolina Senate (1971–1973), recipient of Bronze Star Medal.
 Emik Avakian, 90, American inventor.
 Egbert Brieskorn, 77, German mathematician.
 Nookala Chinna Satyanarayana, 89, Indian Carnatic musician.
Robert Crichton-Brown, 93, Australian businessman.
Aarne Nuorvala, 101, Finnish jurist.
 Eugene Parks Wilkinson, 94, American naval officer and nuclear power advocate, first CO of the USS Long Beach, founding CEO of the Institute of Nuclear Power Operations.

12
Mathieu Bénézet, 67, French writer and poet.
M. Bhaskar, 78, South Indian filmmaker, heart attack.
 Paul Bhattacharjee, 53, British actor (EastEnders, Casino Royale, The Best Exotic Marigold Hotel), suicide.
 Amar Bose, 83, American audio executive, founder of Bose Corporation.
Derek Brown, 80, Scottish rugby union player.
 Ray Butt, 78, British television director and producer (Only Fools and Horses).
 Pratap Chitnis, Baron Chitnis, 77, British politician, Head of the Liberal Party Organisation (1966–1969).
 Robert Fukuda, 91, American politician and lawyer, member of the Hawaii House of Representatives (1959–1962).
 Antun Kropivšek, 88, Croatian Olympic gymnast.
 Mohammed Adam Mallik, 61, Indian political leader, president of Majlis Bachao Tehreek, cardiac arrest.
 Elaine Morgan, 92, Welsh writer, feminist and evolutionary theorist (The Aquatic Ape).
 Pran, 93, Indian actor, pneumonia.
 Takako Takahashi, 81, Japanese novelist and French language translator, heart failure.
 James L. Voss, 79, American veterinarian and equine specialist, Dean of CSU College of Veterinary Medicine and Biomedical Sciences (1986–2001).
 Alan Whicker, 91, British journalist and broadcaster (Whicker's World), bronchial pneumonia.
Abu Zahar Ithnin, 74, Malaysian politician, complications from kidney disease.

13
 Henry Paget, 7th Marquess of Anglesey, 90, British nobleman and author.
 Bana, 81, Cape Verdean morna singer and musician, multiple organ failure.
 Bertha Becker, 82, Brazilian geographer.
 John Cowdery, 83, American politician, member of the Alaska House of Representatives (1983–1985, 1997–2000) and Senate (2001–2009).
 Leonard Garment, 89, American lawyer and presidential adviser, central figure in Watergate scandal.
 William E. Glenn, 87, American inventor and academic.
 Louis G. Hill, 89, American politician and judge.
 Henri Julien, 84, French car industrialist (Automobiles Gonfaronnaises Sportives).
 Cory Monteith, 31, Canadian actor (Glee, Kyle XY, Monte Carlo) and singer, heroin and alcohol overdose.
 Ottavio Quattrocchi, 74, Italian businessman, central figure in the Bofors scandal, heart attack.
 Sharmila Rege, 48, Indian sociologist, feminist and author, complications from colon cancer.
 Mona Røkke, 73, Norwegian politician, MP (1977–1989), Justice Minister (1981–1985), cancer.
 Vernon B. Romney, 89, American politician, Utah Attorney General (1969–1977).
 Marc Simont, 97, French-born American children's book illustrator, Caldecott Medal winner for A Tree is Nice (1957).
 George W. Stocking, Jr., 84, American historian.
 Kip Tokuda, 66, American politician, member of the Washington House of Representatives (1994–2002), heart attack.

14
 Tonino Accolla, 64, Italian actor and voice actor.
 Herbert M. Allison, 69, American financial executive (Merrill Lynch), Assistant US Secretary of the Treasury (2009–2010), oversaw TARP, heart attack.
 Matt Batts, 91, American baseball player (Boston Red Sox, Detroit Tigers).
 Dennis Burkley, 67, American actor (King of the Hill, The Doors, Murphy's Romance), heart attack.
 Flemming Hansen, 64, Danish Olympic handball player (1972).
 Simmie Hill, 66, American basketball player.
 Thad J. Jakubowski, 89, American Roman Catholic prelate, Auxiliary Bishop of Chicago (1988–2003).
 Jenny Lay, 74, British politician, Lord Mayor of Norwich, cancer.
 Saturnino Rustrián, 70, Guatemalan Olympic road racing cyclist (1968).
 George Smith, 92, British footballer (Manchester City).
 Bill Warner, 44, American motorcycle racer, set land speed record on a conventional motorcycle (2011), motorcycle collision.
 Vladimir Mikhailovich Zakharov, 67, Russian choreographer.

15
 Ninos Aho, 68, Syrian Assyrian poet and activist.
 Gordon Belcourt, 68, American Blackfeet tribal executive and social advocate.
 Henry Braden, 68, American politician, member of the Louisiana State Senate (1978–1984), heart failure.
*Aldo Calderón van Dyke, 45, Honduran journalist and news anchor, poisoning.
 Tom Greenwell, 57, American judge, suicide by gunshot.
 Earl Gros, 72, American football player (Green Bay Packers, Philadelphia Eagles).
 Reiner Kossmann, 86, German Olympic ice hockey player.
 Noël Lee, 88, Chinese-born French-American classical pianist and composer.
 Meskerem Legesse, 26, Ethiopian Olympic runner (2004), heart attack.
 John T. Riedl, 51, American computer scientist, melanoma.

16
 Robert Ackman, 85, Canadian chemist.
 Nobuyuki Aihara, 78, Japanese gymnast.
 Todd Bennett, 51, British Olympic runner (1988) and silver medalist (1984), cancer.
 Talia Castellano, 13, American internet celebrity, neuroblastoma.
 Alex Colville, 92, Canadian painter.
 Barun De, 80, Indian historian and academic.
Elmer T. Lee, 93, American drink distiller.
 Torbjørn Falkanger, 85, Norwegian Olympic silver medalist ski jumper (1952).
 T-Model Ford, 93, American blues musician, respiratory failure.
Sundararajan Krishna, 75, Indian cricketer.
 Mario Laserna Pinzón, 89, French-born Colombian educator, diplomat and politician, Ambassador to France and Austria, Senator (1991–1995), Alzheimer's disease.
 Don McIntyre, 98, Australian football player (Carlton Football Club).
 Frank Moretti, 69, American academic. (death announced on this date)
 Shringar Nagaraj, 74, Indian film producer and actor, kidney failure.
Carlotta Nobile, 24,  Italian art historian, violinist, writer and blogger, melanoma.
 Camilla Odhnoff, 85, Swedish politician, Governor of Blekinge County (1974–1992).
 Hassan Pakandam, 79, Iranian Olympic boxer (1964).
 Yuri Prokhorov, 83, Russian mathematician.
 Marv Rotblatt, 85, American baseball player (Chicago White Sox).
Brian Sollitt, 74, British inventor, heart attack.

17
 Henri Alleg, 91, British-born French-Algerian journalist.
 Peter Appleyard, 84, British-born Canadian jazz musician and composer, natural causes.
 Vincenzo Cerami, 72, Italian screenwriter (Life Is Beautiful).
 David Collins, 57, Irish restaurant designer (Gordon Ramsay at Royal Hospital Road, The Wolseley), skin cancer.
 Mansour Eid, 69, Lebanese writer. (death announced on this date)
*Adhemar Esquivel Kohenque, 82, Bolivian Roman Catholic prelate, Bishop of Tarija (1995–2004).
 Don Flye, 80, American tennis player.
 Sir Ian Gourlay, 92, British army general, Commandant General Royal Marines (1971–1975).
 Richard James, 87, American politician, member of the Oklahoma House of Representatives (1951–1954).
 Santosh Lal, 29, Indian cricketer, pancreatitis.
 George Lyn, 81, Jamaican politician, MP for North Central Clarendon (1993–2002), complications from a heart attack.
 Briony McRoberts, 56, British actress (Take the High Road), hit by train.
Slobodan Obradov, 94, Serbian physician.
 Luis Ubiña, 73, Uruguayan footballer.
 Davie White, 80, Scottish football player and manager (Clyde, Rangers, Dundee).

18
 Olivier Ameisen, 60, French-born American cardiologist, myocardial infarction.
 Anatoly Budayev, 44, Belarusian footballer.
 John R. Deane, Jr., 94, American military officer, Commanding General of the 173rd Airborne Brigade and US Army Materiel Command.
 Mary Eide, 89, Norwegian politician.
 Ivar P. Enge, 90, Norwegian radiologist.
 Larry Grathwohl, 65, American informant, spied on Weather Underground for FBI, natural causes.
 Abdul Razak Abdul Hamid, 88, Malaysian academic, sole Malaysian survivor of Hiroshima atomic bomb.
 Francis X. Kane, 94, American space engineer.
 Willie Louis, 76, American key witness in Emmett Till murder trial.
 Kåre Lunden, 83, Norwegian historian.
 John H. Moore II, 85, American senior (former chief) judge, member of the US District Court for Middle Florida (since 1981), Florida Court of Appeals (1977–1981).
 Samar Mukherjee, 99, Indian politician, MP for Howrah (1971–1984), Senator (1986–1993), West Bengal MLA for Howrah (1957–1971), respiratory failure.
 C. Perumal, 62, Indian politician, Tamil Nadu MLA for Yercaud (1989–1996, since 2011), cardiac arrest.
 Vaughn Ross, 41, American convicted murderer, execution by lethal injection.
 Norman Sillman, 92, British sculptor and coin designer.
 Florentinus Sului Hajang Hau, 64, Indonesian Roman Catholic prelate, Bishop of Samarinda (1993), Archbishop of Samarinda (since 2003).
 Vaali, 81, Indian Tamil lyricist, writer, poet and actor.

19
 Richard Carey, 84, American politician, member of the Maine House of Representatives (1967–1978), Maine Senate (1990–1998), mayor of Waterville (1970–1978).
 Paul Côté, 69, Canadian Olympic bronze medallist sailor (1972) and co-founder of Greenpeace.
Leyla Erbil, 82, Tirkish writer.
 Mikhail Gorsheniov, 39, Russian punk rock musician (Korol i Shut), drug overdose.
 Fritz Griesser, 84, Swiss Olympic sprinter.
 Alan Hunt, 85, Australian politician, member of the Victorian Legislative Council (1961–1992).
A K Azizul Huq, 84,  Bangladeshi civil servant, Comptroller and Auditor General (1983–1989).
 Gordon McKenzie, 86, American Olympic long distance runner (1956, 1960).
Ulla Mitzdorf, 69, German scientist.
 Geeto Mongol, 82, Canadian professional wrestler (Stampede Wrestling, WWWF).
 Simon Pimenta, 93, Indian Roman Catholic prelate, Archbishop of Bombay (1978–1996), Cardinal (1988–1996).
 Poncie Ponce, 80, American actor (Hawaiian Eye), heart failure.
 Wilf Proudfoot, 91, British politician, businessman and hypnotist, MP for Cleveland (1959–1964); Brighouse and Spenborough (1970–1974).
 Sarvesh Singh Seepu, 35, Indian politician, Uttar Pradesh MLA for Azamgarh (2007–2012), shot.
 Mel Smith, 60, English comedian and actor (Not the Nine O'Clock News, Alas Smith and Jones, The Princess Bride), heart attack.
 Bert Trautmann, 89, German footballer (Manchester City), heart failure.
 Phil Woosnam, 80, Welsh football player, coach and commissioner (NASL, 1968–1982), complications from prostate cancer and Alzheimer's disease.
 Peter Ziegler, 84, Swiss geologist.

20
 Efstathios Alexandris, 92, Greek lawyer and politician, MP (1977–1989), Minister of Justice (1981–1982), Minister for Mercantile Marine (1985–1987).
 John Casablancas, 70, American modeling agent and scout, founder of Elite Model Management, cancer.
 Leonel Duarte, 64, Portuguese Olympic wrestler.
 Pierre Fabre, 87, French pharmaceutical and cosmetics executive, founder of Laboratoires Pierre Fabre.
 André Grobéty, 80, Swiss footballer.
 Khurshed Alam Khan, 94, Indian politician, Governor of Goa (1989–1991) and Karnataka (1991–1999), aortic stenosis.
 Nkosiphendule Kolisile, 40, South African politician, traffic collision.
Aleksandar Lilov, 80, Bulgarian politician and philosopher.
 Mark Mahowald, 81, American mathematician.
 Oommen Mathew, 73, Indian politician, Kerala MLA for Kuttanad (1980–1982).
 Kotagiri Vidyadhara Rao, 66, Indian politician, Andhra Pradesh MLA for Chintalapudi (1983–2004), cardiac arrest.
 Robert Ritson, 76, Australian politician, member of the South Australian Legislative Council (1979–1993).
 Augustus Rowe, 92, Canadian physician and politician, Newfoundland and Labrador MLA for Carbonear (1971–1975).
 Thomas Salmon, 100, Irish Anglican clergy, Dean of Christ Church Cathedral, Dublin (1969–1990).
 David Spenser, 79, Sri Lankan-born British radio play performer (Just William), actor and producer.
 Helen Thomas, 92, American journalist and author, member of the White House press corps.

21
 Andrea Antonelli, 25, Italian motorcycle racer (World Supersport Championship), race collision.
 Thony Belizaire, 58, Haitian news photographer (AFP), complications from respiratory difficulty.
Yair Clavijo, 18, Peruvian footballer, cerebral edema.
 Ronnie Cutrone, 65, American artist.
*Det de Beus, 55, Dutch Olympic field hockey champion (1984) and bronze medal-winner (1988), cancer.
*Denys de La Patellière, 92, French film director (Marco the Magnificent) and novelist.
 Lourembam Brojeshori Devi, 32, Indian Olympic judoka (2000), complications from pregnancy.
 Sonny Gandee, 84, American football player (Detroit Lions).
 Irene Gleeson, 68, Australian humanitarian, throat cancer.
 Marvin Price, 81, American Negro league baseball player.
 Ugo Riccarelli, 59, Italian novelist, complications from a heart and lung transplant.
 Luis Fernando Rizo-Salom, 41, Colombian composer, hang–gliding accident.
 Jude Speyrer, 84, American Roman Catholic prelate, Bishop of Lake Charles (1980–2000).
Vratislav Štěpánek, 83, Czech bishop.
 Fred Taylor, 93, American football coach (Texas Christian University, 1967–1970).
Rodney Wallace, 64, American football player (Dallas Cowboys).

22
John Tuson Bennett, 75, Australian solicitor and Holocaust denier.
 Guthrie S. Birkhead, Jr., 92, American educator and professor.
 Hugo Black, Jr., 91, American attorney.
 Natalie de Blois, 92, American architect.
 Dennis Farina, 69, American actor (Law & Order, Snatch, Midnight Run), pulmonary embolism.
 Ramon T. Jimenez, 89, Filipino lawyer.
 Ali Maow Maalin, 59, Somali health worker, last person to survive smallpox, malaria.
 Lawrie Reilly, 84, Scottish footballer (Hibernian F.C., national team).
 Mike Shipley, 56, Australian-born British Grammy Award-winning sound engineer and music producer (Def Leppard), apparent suicide.
 Chandrika Prasad Srivastava, 93, Indian civil servant, Chairman of the SCI, Secretary General of the IMO, recipient of the Padma Vibhushan (2009).
 Keron Thomas, 37, American train thief, heart attack.
 Rosalie E. Wahl, 88, American jurist, member of the Minnesota Supreme Court (1977–1994).

23
 Rona Anderson, 86, Scottish actress (Scrooge, The Prime of Miss Jean Brodie).
 Dragan Babić, 76, Serbian journalist.
 Pauline Clarke, 92, English children's author.
 Arthur J. Collingsworth, 69, American diplomat, complications of bone marrow cancer.
 William P. Costas, 84, American politician, member of the Indiana Senate (1980–1988).
 Dominguinhos, 72, Brazilian composer and singer, infection and cardiac complications.
Marvin Gray, 58,  American murderer and suspected serial killer
 Emile Griffith, 75, U.S. Virgin Island boxer, world middleweight, junior middleweight and welterweight champion, complications from dementia.
 Kim Jong-hak, 61, South Korean television director, charcoal-burning suicide.
 Pino Massara, 82, Italian musician, composer, record producer and conductor.
 Red McManus, 88, American basketball coach (Creighton University).
 Luis Mendez, 22, Belizean footballer (Verdes FC), traffic collision.
 Károly Molnár, 69, Hungarian mechanical engineer and politician, minister without portfolio in charge of research and development (2008–2009).
 Mike Morwood, 62, Australian archaeologist, discoverer of the Flores hobbit, cancer.
 Mohammed Said Nabulsi, 85, Jordanian politician and banker.
 Ulrich Nitzschke, 79, German Olympic boxer.
 Jean Pede, 86, Belgian politician.
 Djalma Santos, 84, Brazilian footballer, two-time World Cup winner (1958, 1962), complications from pneumonia.
 Manjula Vijayakumar, 59, Indian actress, blood clot in the stomach.

24
Enrique Beotas, 58, Spanish journalist and writer, injures from Santiago de Compostela derailment.
 Garry Davis, 91, American peace activist.
 Fred Dretske, 80, American philosopher and epistemologist.
Arne Eriksen, 95, Norwegian footballer.
Ernie Ernst, 88, American assistant district attorney.
 Virginia E. Johnson, 88, American sexologist (Masters & Johnson) and psychologist.
 Pius Langa, 74, South African judge, Chief Justice (2005–2009), member of the Constitutional Court (1994–2009).
 Chiwoniso Maraire, 37, Zimbabwean Mbira singer, lung infection.
 Ryuchi Matsuda, 75, Japanese martial arts writer.
 Adrian Shepherd, 74, British cellist.
 Donald Symington, 88, American actor (Annie Hall, Mighty Aphrodite), Parkinson's disease.
 Jim Underwood, 67, American Guamanian politician, member of the Legislature of Guam (1976–1984).

25
 Steve Berrios, 68, American jazz drummer.
 Mohamed Brahmi, 58, Tunisian politician and opposition leader, MP for Movement of the People (since 2011), shot.
 Peter Bridgeman, 80, British military officer.
F. John Clendinnen, 88, Australian philosopher of science.
 Walter De Maria, 77, American sculptor (The Lightning Field), stroke.
 Graeme Farrell, 70, Australian cricketer.
 León Ferrari, 92, Argentinian conceptual artist.
 Nic Gotham, 53, Canadian jazz saxophonist and composer (Nigredo Hotel), cancer.
 William J. Guste, 91, American politician, member of the Louisiana Senate (1968–1972), Attorney General of Louisiana (1972–1992).
 Hugh Huxley, 89, British biologist, won Copley Medal (1997).
Buland Iqbal, 83, Pakistani composer.
 Barnaby Jack, 35, New Zealand computer specialist and security researcher, heroin, cocaine, Benadryl and Xanax overdose.
Andrew Lackey, 29, American murderer, execution by lethal injection.
 Bernadette Lafont, 74, French actress (The Mother and the Whore, An Impudent Girl, Le Beau Serge), cardiac arrest.
 Duilio Marzio, 89, Argentinian actor, cardiac arrest.
 Jim McNally, 61, American Major League Baseball umpire.
 Arun Nehru, 69, Indian politician.
 Rick Norton, 69, American football player (Miami Dolphins), heart disease.
 Juan David Ochoa Vásquez, 65, Colombian convicted drug lord, co-founder of Medellín cartel, heart attack.
 Kongar-ol Ondar, 51, Russian Tuvan throat singer, brain hemorrhage.
 Philip Russell, 93, South African primate and Archbishop of Cape Town (1980–1986).
 Hans Tanzler, 86, American politician, mayor of Jacksonville, Florida (1967–1979).

26
 Shafiga Akhundova, 89, Azerbaijani composer.
 Jim Barnett, 86, American politician, member of the Mississippi House of Representatives (1992–2008).
 JJ Cale, 74, American Grammy Award-winning singer-songwriter ("After Midnight", "Cocaine") and musician, heart attack.
Edna Cisneros, 83, American lawyer.
 Luther F. Cole, 87, American politician and judge, member of the Louisiana House (1964–1966), Louisiana Supreme Court (1986–1992).
 Árpád Duka-Zólyomi, 72, Slovak politician for Hungarian minority, MEP (2004–2009).
 Harley Flanders, 87, American mathematician.
 Marco Antonio Flores, 76, Guatemalan author, natural causes.
 Leighton Gage, 71, American crime author, pancreatic cancer.
 Bellino Giusto Ghirard, 78, French Roman Catholic prelate, Bishop of Rodez (1991–2011).
 Lafif Lakhdar, 79, Tunisian writer and journalist.
 Jon Leyne, 55, British journalist (BBC News), brain tumour.
 Douglas Manley, 91, Jamaican politician, MP for South Manchester (1972–1976).
 George P. Mitchell, 94, American businessman, real estate developer, and pioneer of shale gas technology.
 Bob Savage, 91, American baseball player (Philadelphia Athletics, St. Louis Browns).
 Christoph Scriba, 83, German historian of mathematics.
 Obaid Siddiqi, 81, Indian biologist and academic, traffic collision.
 Sung Jae-ki, 45, South Korean rights activist, drowned.
 Unbridled's Song, 20, American thoroughbred horse, winner of Breeders' Cup Juvenile (1995), euthanized.
 Don Wilbanks, 86, American actor.

27
 Fernando Alonso, 98, Cuban ballet dancer, founder of National Ballet.
 Henryk Baranowski, 70, Polish actor.
 Lindy Boggs, 97, American politician, member of the U.S. House of Representatives from Louisiana (1973–1991), Ambassador to the Holy See (1997–2001), natural causes.
 Sékou Camara, 27, Malian footballer (Pelita Bandung Raya), heart attack.
 Bud Day, 88, American USAF commander (Vietnam War), Medal of Honor recipient.
 Nick Evers, 75, Australian politician, Tasmanian MHA for Franklin (1986–1990).
 Mick Farren, 69, British music journalist, author and singer (The Deviants), heart attack.
 Jóhannes Jónsson, 72, Icelandic businessman (Baugur Group).
 Herb Kaplow, 86, American news correspondent (NBC News, ABC News), stroke.
 Kidd Kraddick, 53, American radio and television personality (Kidd Kraddick in the Morning; Dish Nation), cardiac arrest.
 Suzanne Krull, 47, American actress (Nash Bridges, Race to Witch Mountain, Go), ruptured aortic aneurysm.
Michel Lemoine, 90, French actor and film director.
Billy Lewis, 90, Welsh professional footballer.
 John Nunneley, 90, British army officer.
 Julito Rodríguez, 87, Puerto Rican bolero singer, guitarist and composer (Los Panchos).
 Santiago Santamaría, 60, Argentinian footballer (Stade de Reims), heart attack.
Jacob Immanuel Schochet, 77, Swiss-born Canadian rabbi and scholar.
 Ilya Segalovich, 48, Russian technology executive, co-founder of Yandex, complications from stomach cancer.
 Virginia Tezak, 85, American baseball player.
 Richard Thomas, 87, American ballet teacher and dancer (New York City Ballet), stroke during treatment of pulmonary embolism.
 Pete Tunstall, 94, British RAF squadron leader, World War II POW in Colditz.

28
 Mustafa Adrisi, 91, Ugandan military officer and politician, Vice President (1977–1978).
 William F. Bell, 74, Canadian politician, mayor of Richmond Hill, Ontario (1988–2006).
 Eileen Brennan, 80, American actress (The Last Picture Show, Private Benjamin, Clue), Emmy winner (1981), bladder cancer.
 Frank Castillo, 44, American baseball player (Chicago Cubs), drowning.
Claude Croté, 75, Belgian footballer.
 Lois DeBerry, 68, American politician, member of the Tennessee House of Representatives (since 1972), pancreatic cancer.
 George Kinzie Fitzsimons, 84, American Roman Catholic prelate, Bishop of Salina (1984–2004).
 Drungo Hazewood, 53, American baseball player (Baltimore Orioles), cancer.
Syed Tajammul Hussain, 62, Pakistani chemist and physicist.
Leena Luostarinen, 64, Finnish painter.
 Cleto Maule, 82, Italian cyclist.
 Mykola Melnyk, 59, Ukrainian pilot, liquidator hero.
 Graham Murray, 58, Australian rugby league player and coach, complications from a heart attack.
*Princess Norodom Vichara, 68, Cambodian royal and politician, MP (1998–2003), lung cancer.
 Jagdish Raj, 84, Indian actor, respiratory arrest.
 Rita Reys, 88, Dutch jazz singer, intracranial hemorrhage.
 Otto Schultz, 93, German Luftwaffe ace during World War II and Iron Cross recipient.
 George Scott, 69, American baseball player (Boston Red Sox, Milwaukee Brewers).
 William Scranton, 96, American politician, Governor of Pennsylvania (1963–1967), Ambassador to the United Nations (1976–1977), cerebral hemorrhage.
 Ray Strauss, 85, Australian cricketer.
 Jūgatsu Toi, 64, Japanese travel writer, lung cancer.
 Ersilio Tonini, 99, Italian Roman Catholic prelate, Bishop of Macerata-Tolentino (1969–1975), Archbishop of Ravenna (1975–1990), and Cardinal (since 1994).

29
 Ludwig Averkamp, 86, German Roman Catholic prelate, Bishop of Osnabrück (1987–1994), Archbishop of Hamburg (1994–2002).
 Christian Benítez, 27, Ecuadorian footballer (El Jaish SC, Birmingham City), cardiac arrest.
 Bernard Codd, 79, British motorcycle racer.
 Bobby Crespino, 75, American football player (Cleveland Browns, New York Giants).
 Norman de Mesquita, 81, British sports journalist and broadcaster.
 Peter Flanigan, 90, American investment banker, political campaign manager and presidential adviser.
 Tony Gaze, 93, Australian military officer, RAF World War II flying ace and Grand Prix race car driver.
 Munir Hussain, 83, Pakistani cricketer, journalist and broadcaster, cardiac arrest.
 Rocky Jones, 71, Canadian social activist, heart attack.
 Shivram Dattatray Joshi, 87, Indian Sanskrit scholar.
 Draga Matković, 105, Croatian-born German classical pianist.
 Ole Henrik Moe, 93, Norwegian pianist, art historian and critic.
 Hussain Najadi, 75, Bahraini banker, founder and managing director of AmBank, shot.
 S. N. Hanumantha Rao, 83, Indian cricket umpire.
 Godfrey Stafford, 93, British physicist.
 Sheila Whitaker, 77, British film programmer, director of London Film Festival (1987–1996).

30
 Cecil Alexander, 95, American architect.
 Uwe Bahnsen, 83, German car designer.
 Berthold Beitz, 99, German industrialist (ThyssenKrupp), member of IOC (1972–1988).
 Robert Neelly Bellah, 86, American sociologist, religious academic and author, complications from heart surgery.
 Harry F. Byrd, Jr., 98, American politician, member of the United States Senate from Virginia (1965–1983).
 Thomas G. Clines, 84, American CIA agent. 
 Ron Dias, 76, American animator (The Chipmunk Adventure, The Secret of NIMH, Who Framed Roger Rabbit) and painter.
Zyrafete Gashi, 55, Kosovar comedian.
 Álvarez Guedes, 86, Cuban writer and comedian, stomach ailment.
 Sir Reginald Harland, 93, British Royal Air Force commander.
Myfanwy Horne, 80, Australian journalist, writer, reviewer and book editor.
 İsa Huso, 60, Syrian Kurdish politician, bombing.
 Eko Maulana Ali, 61, Indonesian politician, Governor of Bangka Belitung (since 2007), complications from kidney disease.
Jim McGregor, 91, American basketball player.
Jane Belk Moncure, 86, American author of early childhood non-fiction, fiction and poetry.
 Belal Muhammad, 77, Bangladeshi radio broadcaster and independence activist.
 Colm Murray, 61, Irish sports journalist and broadcaster (RTÉ), motor neurone disease.
 Lawrence Nowlan, 48, American sculptor (Espy Award, My VH1 Music Awards, statues of Harry Kalas, Jackie Gleason), natural causes.
 Antoni Ramallets, 89, Spanish footballer.
 Ossie Schectman, 94, American basketball player (New York Knicks).
 Harry Smith, 94, American football player (Detroit Lions) and coach (Saskatchewan Roughriders).
 Jean-Claude Suares, 71, American graphic design artist, heart failure.
 Irene Uchida, 96, Canadian scientist and Down syndrome researcher.
 Antonio Vidal Fernández, 85, Cuban artist.
 Benjamin Walker, 99, Indian-born British author.
 Gene Wettstone, 100, American gymnastics coach (Penn State University, USA Gymnastics).

31
 Michael Ansara, 91, Syrian-born American actor (Broken Arrow, Star Trek, Batman: The Animated Series), complications from Alzheimer's disease.
 Earl Barbry, 62, American Tunica-Biloxi tribal leader, Chairman (since 1978), cancer.
William J. Cousins, 89, American sociologist.
 Michel Donnet, 96, British-born Belgian military officer, RAF wing commander during World War II.
 John Graves, 92, American author (Goodbye to a River).
Judge Hughes, 69, American football player and coach, diabetes.
Gail Levin, 67, American documentary film director, breast cancer.
Corey Maclin, 43, American television broadcaster, announcer, play-by-play commentator and politician, car crash.
 Jean Madiran, 93, French nationalist writer.
Mary Matz, 81, American theologian.
 Wendell Alverson Miles, 97, American senior judge of the US District Court for Western Michigan (1974–2008), US Foreign Intelligence Surveillance Court (1989–1996).
 Antonio Moreno Casamitjana, 86, Chilean Roman Catholic prelate, Archbishop of Concepción (1989–2006).
 Hirohiko Nakamura, 70, Japanese politician.
 David Stockings, 67, English cricketer (Norfolk).
 Trevor Storer, 83, English businessman and entrepreneur, founder of Pukka Pies.
 Gerald W. Thomas, 94, American academic, President of New Mexico State University (1970–1984).
 Alvis Wayne, 75, American rockabilly musician, liver cancer.
 Jon Manchip White, 89, Welsh–born American novelist and screenwriter.

References

2013-07
 07